Damrong Sirisakorn (born 27 October 1950) is a Thai sailor. He started sailing when he joined the Navy around age 21, and first competed at the 1975 SEAP Games, where he won a gold medal. He competed in the 470 event at the 1976 Summer Olympics. He won gold at the 1978 Asian Games and the 1985 SEA Games. He holds the naval rank of lieutenant commander.

References

External links
 

1950 births
Living people
Damrong Sirisakorn
Damrong Sirisakorn
Sailors at the 1976 Summer Olympics – 470
Place of birth missing (living people)
Asian Games medalists in sailing
Sailors at the 1978 Asian Games
Medalists at the 1978 Asian Games
Damrong Sirisakorn
Damrong Sirisakorn